Paris Square (Kikar Pariz, also called: France Square = Kikar Tzarfat) is a town square in Rehavia, Jerusalem. 

The name France Square was established in 1959. In 2007 the city of Paris gave Jerusalem a "French Fountain" that was built in the middle of the square. From that time the square has been called: "Paris Square".

The square is near the official residence of the Prime Minister of Israel and became a major protest site during the 2020-21 protests against Benjamin Netanyahu.

References 

Squares in Jerusalem
Rehavia